Erin Darling is an American television personality, actress, and comedian who has appeared on IFC, AMC, FUEL TV, and Adult Swim on Cartoon Network. She is a self-proclaimed "professional nerd" with a strong fanbase in the Comic Con and genre film communities.

Biography 
Darling was born in San Jose, California and graduated from University of Southern California with a BA in Broadcast Journalism.

Career
Darling began her career in entertainment reporting at TMZ.com. She gained a strong internet fan base as producer and host of the live, streaming, and interactive show “Twending” on TheStream.tv which led to on-camera opportunities at IFC, Adult Swim, Clevver Media, Defy Media, FabFitFun, and on daily movie show, AMC Movie Talk.

In 2013 Darling joined popular Internet channel What's Trending as a daily correspondent and host. It was also announced that she would join Shock Til You Drop and The Orchard on a new channel creating content in horror film and media, including reviews and commentary on the latest theatrical movie releases and television programs and is available through The Orchard's Multi Channel Network. She also partnered with Stan Lee, becoming the host of his online content for Marvel Comics and POW! Entertainment.

In 2014 and 2015 she embarked on a nationwide stand-up comedy tour with Tom Green. She was favorable received and reviewed, described as "that fascinatingly snide girl at the party whom everyone wants to dish with" by AXS.com.

In 2015 it was announced that Darling would launch CON TV with Cinedigm and Wizard Entertainment, the first interactive show that would live stream Comic Cons, bringing the convention experience directly to viewers at home.

References

External links
website

Living people
American women journalists
USC Annenberg School for Communication and Journalism alumni
People from San Jose, California
Year of birth missing (living people)
21st-century American women